Zuzu Angel is a 2006 Brazilian biographical film based on the life of fashion designer Zuzu Angel.

Cast 
 Patrícia Pillar - Zuzu Angel
 Daniel de Oliveira - Stuart Angel
 Leandra Leal - Sonia
 Alexandre Borges - Fraga
 Luana Piovani - Elke Maravilha
  - Tenente
 Ângela Vieira - Lúcia
 Flavio Bauraqui - Mota
 Regiane Alves - Hildegard Angel
 Fernanda de Freitas - Ana Angel
 Othon Bastos - Brigadeiro
  - Alberto
 Nelson Dantas - Antonio Lamarca
 Paulo Betti - Carlos Lamarca

References

External links 

2000s biographical films
Films about fashion designers
Brazilian biographical films
2000s Portuguese-language films